One Town, One Product (OTOP) is a promotional program of the government of the Philippines. OTOP aims to promote goods and products of Filipino towns, cities, and regions, and provides funding for small businesses. It is administered by the Department of Budget and Management (DBM).

History
The Philippines' OTOP program was proposed by then-President Gloria Macapagal Arroyo as early as 2002 and launched in 2004. The OTOP program was originally scheduled to end in 2010. DBM dropped OTOP funding in spring 2011. However, current Filipino President Benigno 'Noynoy" Aquino has authorized the continuation of the OTOP program.

OTOP Philippines is a priority stimulus program for Micro and Small and Medium-scale enterprises (MSMEs) as government's customized intervention to drive inclusive local economic growth. The program enables localities and communities to determine, develop, support, and promote culturally-rooted products or services where they can be the best at or best renowned for.

OTOP Next Gen is DTI's program to LEVEL UP these products and services. Building from the gains of OTOP first generation, this initiative aims to offer a package of public-private assistance in order for MSMEs with minimum viable products to come up with new or better offerings with significant improvement
4
and innovation in the areas of quality, product development, design, standards compliance, marketability, production capability, brand development, among others.

In keeping with DTI's various thrusts and priorities, OTOP Next Gen shall also align support to DTI and PDP-identified priority industries. OTOP products shall still leverage on “Pride of Place” and cultural value while working in the backdrop of market-responsiveness
OTOP products are identified based primarily on its (1) cultural value – heritage, local customs, living traditions, or a vintage recipe passed on from generations; (2) abundant resources or skills – available raw materials and a pool of skills readily deployable in the locality or proximate ones; (3) competitive advantage – a locality's innate or endemic strength anchored on several variables like topography, climate, geographic location, among others. MSMEs who engage in business within the value chain of OTOP products (raw material suppliers, processing, distributor, retailer, but mostly the manufacturers, etc.) are called OTOPreneurs.

Examples of OTOP Products
OTOP products vary, and can include fruits, specialty dishes, or handmade products. Examples of OTOP products include Arabica coffee in the Cordillera region, cacao products in San Isidro in Davao del Norte, and brooms in Santa Fe in Nueva Vizcaya.

See also 
 One Tambon One Product
 One Village One Product
 One Town One Product (OTOP) – Taiwan

References

External links
One Town One Product official website
OTOP at the Department of Trade and Industry

Economy of the Philippines
Department of Budget and Management (Philippines)